Keisilyn Yorleny Gutiérrez Arenales (born 19 March 1997) is a Panamanian footballer who plays as a forward for Universitario and the Panama women's national team.

Career
Gutiérrez has been capped to the Panama women's national team, including an appearance on 28 January 2020 in the 2020 CONCACAF Women's Olympic Qualifying Championship against Costa Rica, which finished as a 1–6 loss.

Personal life
Gutiérrez works as a teacher at the Juan Demóstenes Arosemena Bilingual Education Center in Valle Hermoso, where she teaches pre-kindergarten through 9th grade. She also gives classes at "El Domo" at the University of Panama, and is pursuing a degree in sports education.

See also
 List of Panama women's international footballers

References

External links
 

1997 births
Living people
Panamanian women's footballers
Women's association football forwards
Panama women's international footballers